Minnie "Maud" Powell (August 22, 1867 – January 8, 1920) was an American violinist who gained international acclaim for her skill and virtuosity.

Biography 
Powell was born in Peru, Illinois. Her mother was Wilhelmina "Minnie" Bengelstraeter Powell, and her father was William Bramwell Powell.  W.B. Powell wrote numerous books such as The Normal Course of Reading and served as superintendent of Peru Elementary School District 124 from 1862 to 1870. She was the niece of John Wesley Powell, an American Civil War hero and famed explorer of the Grand Canyon.  He made his first scientific exploration of the Colorado River in 1869, when Maud was two years old.

Around the age of 7, she began violin and piano lessons in Aurora, located in Kane County, Illinois, a western suburb of Chicago. She was soon recognized as a prodigy and at age 9 began four years of being taken to Chicago for piano study with Agnes Ingersoll and violin study with William Lewis. When she was 13, her parents sold the family home to raise funds to continue her musical education. With her father remaining behind in rented rooms, she traveled with her mother and younger brother William to Europe. There she studied under Henry Schradieck at the Leipzig Conservatoire, Charles Dancla at the Paris Conservatoire (after placing first in the entrance exam), and Joseph Joachim at the Berlin Hochschule, among others. In 1885 she played Bruch's G minor concerto in her debut with the Berlin Philharmonic under Joachim's baton, and again with the New York Philharmonic under Theodore Thomas after she returned to the United States.

She premiered violin concertos by Tchaikovsky and Sibelius in the United States, and performed Dvořák's Violin Concerto on April 7, 1894, with the New York Philharmonic under the baton of Anton Seidl in Carnegie Hall under the supervision of the composer. Powell was a powerful advocate for music by Americans, women, and black composers, including the British composer Samuel Coleridge-Taylor, from whom she commissioned a violin concerto. Powell was a committed champion of the Sibelius Violin Concerto and played it into the repertoire. Max Liebling's Fantasia On Sousa Themes for violin and piano was dedicated to her.

In January 1894, she was initiated honorably into musical women's fraternity Alpha Chi Omega.

On October 31, 1916, she performed in Ottawa, Illinois, on the occasion of the dedication of the Ottawa High School building.

On November 27, 1919 in St. Louis, Missouri, she collapsed on stage of a heart attack.
 On January 8, 1920, she died after another heart attack in Uniontown, Pennsylvania while on tour.

Legacy 
Powell was the first American violinist to achieve international rank. She was among the first instrumentalists to make Red Seal records for the Victor Talking Machine Company, starting in 1904 until 1919. With these recordings she set an enduring standard for violin performance.

In 1986, Powell's biographer Karen A. Shaffer founded the Maud Powell Society for Music and Education to further knowledge of Powell and her significant role in music both in the United States and abroad.

In 1995, her home town of Peru dedicated an 8-foot bronze statue of Powell, sculpted by Joseph Heyd.

In 2007, American violinist Rachel Barton Pine released a CD of music transcribed by, commissioned by or dedicated to Maud Powell.

In 2009, Maud Powell Favorites, a 4-volume set of Powell's transcriptions and works commissioned by her or dedicated to her was published by the Maud Powell Society for Music and Education. The music was compiled by Karen A. Shaffer who wrote the extensive historical introduction and annotations while Rachel Barton Pine served as the music editor.

Maud Powell was posthumously granted the GRAMMY Lifetime Achievement Award on January 25, 2014, at the Recording Academy's 2014 Special Merit Awards Ceremony & Nominees Reception. The award was accepted on behalf of Powell by biographer Karen A. Shaffer and Rachel Barton Pine.

Recordings 
American Virtuosa: Tribute to Maud Powell. Rachel Barton Pine (violin), Matthew Hagle (piano). Cedille Records, 2006: CDR 90000 097
Powell, Maud: Complete Recordings, Vol. 1 (1904–1917). Naxos Records, 2001: 8.110961
Powell, Maud: Complete Recordings, Vol. 2 (1904–1917). Naxos Records, 2001: 8.110962
Powell, Maud: Complete Recordings, Vol. 3 (1904–1917). Naxos Records, 2001: 8.110963
Powell, Maud: Complete Recordings, Vol. 4 (1904–1917). Naxos Records, 2004: 8.110993

See also 
The Maud Powell Signature, Women in Music, an online music periodical

References

External links 

 Maud Powell biography
 Maud Powell society
 Musical Festival dedicated to Maud Powell
 Maud Powell recordings at the Discography of American Historical Recordings.
 Recordings of Maud Powell on the Library of Congress Jukebox
 
 Maud Powell, Chicago Symphony Orchestra: 125 Moments

1867 births
1920 deaths
American classical violinists
Grammy Lifetime Achievement Award winners
People from Aurora, Illinois
Pupils of Joseph Joachim
Victor Records artists
Women classical violinists
19th-century classical violinists
19th-century American musicians
19th-century American women musicians
20th-century classical violinists
20th-century American women musicians
People from Peru, Illinois
Classical musicians from Illinois
20th-century American violinists